Live from Lincoln Center is a seventeen-time Emmy Award-winning series that has broadcast notable performances from the Lincoln Center in New York City on PBS since 1976. The program airs between six and nine times per season. Episodes of Live from Lincoln Center feature Lincoln Center's resident artistic organizations, most notably the New York Philharmonic. Funding for the series is currently made possible by major grants from the Robert Wood Johnson 1962 Charitable Trust, Thomas H. Lee and Ann Tenenbaum, the Robert and Renee Belfer Family Foundation, the MetLife Foundation, Mercedes T. Bass, and the National Endowment for the Arts.

History
Live from Lincoln Center premiered on PBS on January 30, 1976. Since its premiere, the series has presented performances by the world's greatest performing artists. Some of its most notable regular performers include Audra McDonald (the program's official host), Plácido Domingo, Luciano Pavarotti, Leonard Bernstein, Itzhak Perlman, George Balanchine, Isaac Stern, Nathan Lane, James Galway, Billy Porter, Zubin Mehta, James Naughton, Kurt Masur, Kristin Chenoweth, Jason Isbell, Beverly Sills, Yo-Yo Ma, Renée Fleming, Emma Thompson, Joan Sutherland, Josh Groban, Mikhail Baryshnikov, Patina Miller, the New York City Ballet, the Mark Morris Dance Group, the American Ballet Theatre, the Alvin Ailey American Dance Theater, the New York Philharmonic, and the New York City Opera.

Martin Bookspan served as the program announcer from the premiere of Live from Lincoln Center until his retirement in 2006, at which point Fred Child took over. On-camera hosts throughout the broadcast's history have included Dick Cavett, Hugh Downs, Sam Waterston, Garrick Utley, Patrick Watson, and Beverly Sills. Most recently, the host position has been filled by Alan Alda, Alec Baldwin, Lesley Stahl, and currently, Audra McDonald.

The show was originally developed in the mid-1970s by John Goberman, who served as executive producer from 1976 until 2011. In 2012, current Executive Producer Andrew Carl Wilk took over. Through 2012, the show was, in fact, live (or delayed slightly to accommodate PBS scheduling).

Through Goberman and Wilk's leadership, Live from Lincoln Center has gone on to win 17 Emmy Awards, 2 George Foster Peabody Awards, and several other accolades over its time on PBS. The current team of directors for the program is made up of Habib Azar, Dana Calderwood, Alex Coletti, Matthew Diamond, Brad Fuss, Annette Jolles, Lonny Price, Alan Skog, Glenn Weiss, and Andrew Carl Wilk. Kirk Browning is credited as the longest-running director of the series, contributing to the production of 185 episodes, and winning two Primetime Emmys as well as two Daytime Emmys. The show's full-time production team, led by Wilk, is composed of Douglas Chang (Series Producer), Kristy Geslain (Producer, Lincoln Center Media Productions), Danielle Schiffman (Director, Business and Legal Affairs), Daisy Placeres (Line Producer), Gillian Campbell (Manager, Rights and Media), and Nick Palm (Post-Production Supervisor; Lead Editor).

Awards

Notable broadcasts

American Ballet Theater: Swan Lake (Jun. 30, 1976)
New York City Opera: The Barber of Seville (Nov. 3, 1976)
Stern, Perlman & Zukerman: Isaac Stern's 60th Birthday Celebration (Sep. 9, 1980)
Beverly! Her Farewell Performance, An Evening with Danny Kaye (Jan. 5, 1981)
New York City Ballet: A Tribute to George Balanchine (Oct. 10, 1983)
Marilyn Horne's Great American Songbook (Dec. 23, 1983
Aaron Copland's 85th Birthday with the N.Y. Philharmonic & Zubin Mehta (Nov. 14, 1985)
Ray Charles in Concert, A Classical Jazz Christmas with Wynton Marsalis (Dec. 22, 1989)
Yo-Yo Ma in Concert, A Little Night Music (Oct. 14, 1990)
Mozart Bicentennial Birthday Serenade (Jan. 27, 1991)
New York Philharmonic 150th Anniversary (Sep. 7, 1992)
New York City Opera: La traviata (Mar. 28, 1995)
A Celebration of the American Musical (Apr. 7, 1997)
New York Philharmonic & Jazz at Lincoln Center: Ellington at 100 (Apr. 7, 1999)
New York City Ballet: Tchaikovsky's Swan Lake (May 5, 1999)
The Gershwins' Porgy and Bess with the New York City Opera (May 2, 2002)
Lincoln Center Theater Contact (Sep. 1, 2002)
Jazz at L.C. Grand Opening of Frederick P. Rose Hall “One Family of Jazz”, (Oct. 18, 2004)
Jazz at Lincoln Center: “Higher Ground Hurricane Relief Benefit” (Sep. 17, 2005)
A Lincoln Center Special: “30 Years of Live from Lincoln Center” (May 25, 2006)
New York City Ballet: Romeo + Juliet (May 1, 2007)
New York City Opera, Madam Butterfly (Mar. 20, 2008)
Joshua Bell with Friends @ The Penthouse (Jun. 13, 2010)
Wynton at 50 (Oct. 13, 2011)
New York Philharmonic: Bernstein and Gershwin New Year's Eve (Dec. 31, 2011)
Renée Fleming @ The Penthouse (Apr. 6, 2012)
One Singular Sensation! Celebrating Marvin Hamlisch (Dec. 31, 2012)
Rodgers & Hammerstein's Carousel (Apr. 26, 2013)
Audra McDonald in Concert: Go Back Home (May 24, 2013)
New York Philharmonic Gala with Yo-Yo Ma (Dec. 31, 2013)
Richard Tucker at 100: An Opera Celebration (Jan. 10, 2014)
Patina Miller in Concert (Mar. 28, 2014)
James Naughton: The Songs of Randy Newman (Apr. 4, 2014)
Jason Isbell: Moving Forward (Apr. 11, 2014)
The Nance at the Lyceum Theatre (Oct. 10, 2014)
Richard Tucker Opera Gala: A New Century (Jan. 23, 2015)
Billy Porter: Broadway & Soul (Apr. 3, 2015)
Norm Lewis: Who Am I? (Apr. 10, 2015)
Curtain Up: The School of American Ballet Workshop Performances (Aug. 7, 2015)
New York Philharmonic Opening Gala with Lang Lang (Sep. 24, 2015)
Kern & Hammerstein's Show Boat with The New York Philharmonic (Oct. 16, 2015)
Danny Elfman's Music from the Films of Tim Burton (Oct. 30, 2015)
James Lapine: Act One (Nov. 13, 2015)
Sinatra: Voice for a Century (Dec. 18, 2015)
New York Philharmonic New Year's Eve: La Vie Parisienne (Dec. 31, 2015)
50 Years of Mostly Mozart (Feb. 3, 2016)
From Bocelli to Barton: The Richard Tucker Opera Gala (Feb. 5, 2016)
Lincoln Center At the Movies presents: Alvin Ailey American Dance Theater (Nov. 3, 2016)
Lang Lang's New York Rhapsody (Nov. 25, 2016)
Joshua Bell: Seasons of Cuba (Dec. 16, 2016)
New York Philharmonic's New Year's Eve 2016: Enchanted Evening (Dec. 31, 2016)
Falsettos (Oct. 27, 2017)

Home media
Traditionally, Live from Lincoln Center has never been made available on home video due to rights issues. A notable exception was a series of selected classic episodes licensed to Paramount Home Video and released under the "Lincoln Center for the Performing Arts Presents" banner through its Bel Canto Video division in the late '80s. Kultur International Films also released a few episodes on videocassette without any branding.

References

External links

Live from Lincoln Center at PBS

 "Goberman Leaving Lincoln Center" by Mark Schubin, sportsvideo.org, June 8, 2012

PBS original programming
1976 American television series debuts
1980s American television series
1990s American television series
2000s American television series
2010s American television series
Lincoln Center
Peabody Award-winning television programs
Television series by WNET
Television shows filmed in New York City
2020s American television series